Richard Gasquet was the defending champion.

Gasquet successfully defended his title, defeating Jonas Björkman 6–4, 6–3 in the final.

Seeds

  Thomas Johansson (first round)
  Dominik Hrbatý (second round)
  Olivier Rochus (first round)
  Fernando Verdasco (withdrew)
  Dmitry Tursunov (first round)
  Paul-Henri Mathieu (first round)
  Paradorn Srichaphan (second round)
  Nicolás Almagro (first round)
  Xavier Malisse (first round)

Draw

Finals

Top half

Bottom half

External links
 Main draw
 Qualifying draw

Nottingham Open
2006 ATP Tour
2006 Nottingham Open